Arthur Swift (1812–1855) was a 19th-century Texas merchant, surveyor, political and military figure. He along with Rangers Mathew Caldwell and James Campbell were founders of Seguin, Texas and a member of Callahan's Gonzales-Seguin Rangers and a participant in the Texas–Indian wars. He served as a Texas State Representative for Gonzales-Guadalupe County.

Early life and family
Arthur Swift was born in 1812 in Virginia. He moved to Tennessee as a young man, but walked all the way to Texas, when the real estate market turned sour. In 1837, he ended up in Gonzales, Texas.

Career in Texas
In 1838, Swift became one of the founders of Walnut Springs, a new town in Gonzales County, Texas. During this time, he was able to purchase large tracts of land in the area. In Gonzales County, he assisted in legal matters and represented clients and was soon appointed Tax Collector, Constable and Clerk in 1841. He was performing surveys as early as 1838 and later was Gonzales county surveyor from 1840-1844.

Texas Republic Ranger
In 1841, Swift would serve under James Hughes Callahan, as a Gonzales Ranger during the Texas-Indian wars and again with Benjamin McCulloch's volunteers the same year.
His partner James Campbell, had been killed by Indians the previous year. Caldwell would go on serving the city of Gonzales, while Swift, although serving Gonzales, concentrated his efforts in Seguin; purchasing the lands of his partners. In 1842, San Antonio would be overrun twice, by Santa Anna's forces. During March 1842, the citizens of San Antonio would seek refuge at Manuel Flores Ranch in the city of Seguin, Texas. Here, a counterattack was planned and Arthur Swift was a Captain of the party that pursued the army of Ráfael Vásquez. Again in 1842 when Adrian Woll invaded Texas, Arthur Swift would participate at the Battle of the Salado as Second Lieutenant with Mathew Caldwell's resistance forces.

Businessman and politician
In 1846, Guadalupe County was organized through efforts by Swift. Swift would serve as the first Texas State Representative in 1846 and 1847, for Gonzales-Guadalupe County and had introduced the bill that organized the new county. He was married to Margaret Baker on July 2, 1845, daughter of Judge James McCulloch Baker, and they soon had four children. They had a limecrete style home built in Seguin, Texas, operated a ferry on the Guadalupe River and ran a general store in the town. He was also influential in the organization of the schools and First Baptist Church of Seguin. In 1855, his real estate and merchandise holdings were estimated to be worth around $250,000.

Later life
Swift's first wife died around 1853 and in February 1855, Swift would marry Philadelphia Borden, the daughter of Gail Borden, however tragedy struck again and a month and ten days later, in April, his life was taken by a fever. James McCulloch Baker was appointed as administrator of Swift's estate, by the Guadalupe County Court. The Baker family would care for and raise the Swift children. Arthur Swift was buried in the Northwest corner of Vaughan Cemetery, in Seguin, Texas.

Citations

References
 

 
 

1812 births
1855 deaths
People of the Texas Revolution
Texas–Indian Wars
People from Seguin, Texas
Members of the Texas House of Representatives
American city founders
19th-century American politicians